Michael Hugh William Papps (born 2 July 1979) is a former New Zealand cricketer. In October 2016, he became the first player to score 10,000 runs in the Plunket Shield. In April 2018, he announced his retirement from the game.

Domestic career
Papps made his first-class debut in the 1998–99 season for his local provincial club Canterbury Wizards, for which he would go on to make 6,663 runs, second most for an individual player for one province. He switched to Wellington Firebirds in July 2011 after twelves seasons with the Wizards.

In October 2017, he scored 316 not out for Wellington against Auckland in the 2017–18 Plunket Shield season. This was the highest individual score for Wellington in the Plunket Shield. Papps also became the oldest New Zealand batsman to score a triple century in first-class cricket. Papps and Luke Woodcock also made an opening partnership of 432 runs, the highest opening partnership and the highest partnership for any wicket in first-class cricket in New Zealand.

He was the leading run-scorer in the 2017–18 Plunket Shield season, his last, with 814 runs in ten matches.

International career
After a successful career in the junior teams, Papps was selected for the one-day series against South Africa in 2003–04 to solve New Zealand's long-running search for a capable opening batsman to partner Stephen Fleming. He made 59 on his debut but struggled with injuries afterwards. During an ODI against Australia in Auckland in early 2005, he was hit in the head twice by Brett Lee's bouncers. A subsequent scan ruled out brain injury but he never made another ODI appearance after the incident.

References

External links
 
 

1979 births
Living people
New Zealand cricketers
New Zealand Test cricketers
New Zealand One Day International cricketers
Canterbury cricketers
Wellington cricketers
South Island cricketers
Wicket-keepers